The canton of Rive-de-Gier is a French administrative division located in the department of Loire and the Auvergne-Rhône-Alpes region. At the French canton reorganisation which came into effect in March 2015, the canton was expanded from 10 to 11 communes:
Châteauneuf
Dargoire
Farnay
La Grand-Croix
Lorette
Genilac
Rive-de-Gier
Saint-Joseph
Saint-Martin-la-Plaine
Saint-Paul-en-Jarez
Tartaras

See also
Cantons of the Loire department

References

Cantons of Loire (department)